Panic is a Canadian thriller drama film, directed by Jean-Claude Lord and released in 1977. The film centres on a crisis in the fictional city of Port-Champlain, Quebec, after industrial pollution has poisoned the city's drinking water.

The film's cast includes Paule Baillargeon, Jean Coutu, Lise Thouin, Pierre Thériault, Jacques Thisdale, Raymond Lévesque, Gérard Poirier, Jean-Marie Lemieux, Benoît Girard, Claude Michaud, Marc Legault, Pierre Gobeil, J-Léo Gagnon and Roger Lebel.

References

External links

1977 films
1977 drama films
Canadian thriller drama films
Films shot in Quebec
Films directed by Jean-Claude Lord
French-language Canadian films
1970s Canadian films